Kane Le'aupepe (born 3 December 1992 in New Zealand) is a former Samoan rugby union player who plays for the  in Super Rugby. His playing position is lock. He was named in the Hurricanes squad for week 1 in 2019.

On 23 August 2019, he was named in Samoa's 34-man training squad for the 2019 Rugby World Cup, before being named in the final 31 on 31 August.

Reference list

External links
itsrugby.co.uk profile

1992 births
Samoan rugby union players
Samoa international rugby union players
Living people
Rugby union locks
Wellington rugby union players
Bay of Plenty rugby union players
Hurricanes (rugby union) players